Cuba is located in an area with several active fault systems which produce on average about 2000 seismic events each year. While most registered seismic events pass unnoticed, the island has been struck by a number of destructive earthquakes over the past four centuries, including several major quakes with a magnitude of 7.0 or above.

Approximately 70% of seismic activity in Cuba emanates from the Oriente fault zone, located in the Bartlett-Cayman fault system which runs along the south-eastern coast of Cuba and marks the tectonic boundary between the North American Plate and the Caribbean Plate. The 12 currently active faults in Cuba also include the Cauto-Nipe, Cochinos and Nortecubana faults.
Destructive earthquakes originating from the Oriente fault occurred in 1766 (= 7.6), 1852 ( = 7.2) and 1932 ( = 6.75). Some studies suggested there is a high probability the Oriente fault would produce a magnitude 7 earthquake, this happening in January 2020, with a magnitude of 7.7, the highest registered in this country's history.

Notable earthquakes in recent Cuban history include the following:

M = Magnitude on the Richter magnitude scale (ML), except where noted
Intensity= Intensity on the European Macroseismic Scale (EMS-98), which is somewhat similar to the Modified Mercalli scale (MM)

See also 
 Geology of Cuba

References

Other sources
 

 

 
Earthquakes
Cuba